Paradmete is a genus of sea snails, marine gastropod mollusks in the family Volutomitridae.

Species
Species within the genus Paradmete include:

 Paradmete arnaudi Numanami, 1996
 Paradmete breidensis Numanami, 1996
 Paradmete cryptomara (Rochebrune & Mabille, 1885)
 Paradmete curta (Strebel, 1908)
 Paradmete fragillima (Watson, 1882)
 Paradmete percarinata Powell, 1951
Synonyms
 Paradmete longicauda (Strebel, 1908): synonym of Paradmete curta (Strebel, 1908)

References

 Y. Kantor, 2010, Checklist of Recent Volutomitridae

Volutomitridae